The 13"/35 caliber gun Mark 1 (spoken "thirteen-inch-thirty-five-caliber") was used for the primary batteries on eight of the first nine battleships in the United States Navy,  and ;  used the /35 caliber gun.

A 16-inch caliber gun was beyond US manufacturing capabilities at this time though and the largest gun possible was the /35 caliber. The Navy intended to use this gun in short-range action against heavily armored targets and was fitted to the first true battleship in the US Navy, . This turned out to be the only 13-inch gun developed for the US Navy.

Design
The 13-inch Mark 1, gun Nos. 1–12, was a built-up gun constructed in a length of 35 caliber, Mod 0 and Mod 1. The Mod 0 had a tube, jacket, and nine hoops while the Mod 1 had a nickel-steel liner and only eight hoops. The Mark 2, gun Nos. 13–34, was of similar construction as the Mark 1 Mod 0 but had only seven hoops and two locking ring. Two Mark 2 guns, Nos. 23 and 33, were converted into experimental guns. The first, No. 23, was converted in 1923, into a 16-inch/28.8 caliber Mark A Mod 0 experimental gun. The barrel was bored out to 16-inch and hooped to the muzzle. The gun was tested a total of seven times in July 1923, but then set aside until 1956. The gun was used for bomb tests between October and December 1956, and fired another 19 times. This gun is now on display at the Naval Surface Warfare Center in Dahlgren, Virginia. In 2005, it too was still located at the NSWC, Dahlgren.

Incidents
Gun No. 2, mounted on Indiana, suffered from erosion at the front slope of the chamber and was replaced with another gun. It was first reported in September 1897, after only 32 rounds had been fired. In May 1902, No. 2 was sent back to the US Naval Gun Factory to be relined. After having had 71 rounds fired through it, and finding that guns built at the same time and fired the same number of rounds showed no sign of erosion, it was determined that the erosion was due to a defect in the manufacture of the forging.

It was repaired with a lining tube inserted into the barrel and used at the Naval Proving Grounds.

It was replaced with another gun.

Gun No. 34 was completely disabled by an accident to its tube; it was reassembled with new forgings.

Naval service

Notes

References

Books
 
 
 
 
 
Online sources

External links

 Bluejackets Manual, 1917, 4th revision: US Navy 14-inch Mark 1 gun

Naval guns of the United States
330 mm artillery